Farmers Union Gin Company was an American cotton processing company located in San Marcos, Texas. Its main facility, located at 120 Grove Street, is now a registered historic site.

History
In 1908, Henry Kellerman, J. H. Barbee, A. H. Fleming, I. B. Rylander, and J. H. Williams acquired the premises of 120 Grove Street. They then established in 1909 the Farmers Union Gin Company under the leadership of Oscar Calvin Smith Sr. (b. 1876 d. 1948, Texas Cotton Ginners Association organizer and director, San Marcos city commissioner 1924–1941 and mayor 1941–1942), an organization which would proceed to operate San Marcos' largest industrial facility at the time.

The gin continued operations until 1966 and was later recognized by both the Texas Historical Commission and National Register of Historic Places.

Structure
The present building was constructed in 1911 as a replacement for one that was destroyed by fire.

See also

National Register of Historic Places listings in Hays County, Texas
Recorded Texas Historic Landmarks in Hays County

References

Industrial buildings and structures on the National Register of Historic Places in Texas
San Marcos, Texas
National Register of Historic Places in Hays County, Texas
Recorded Texas Historic Landmarks
Cotton gin
Industrial buildings completed in 1910
Cotton industry in the United States